Nike Peller  is a Nigerian-born Yoruba film actress, thespian and stage illusionist. Known to be the daughter of the late Professor Peller, Nike holds the chieftaincy of the Yeye Agbasaga of Erin Osun, a title which was bestowed on her in 2010.

Selected filmography

Aye Lu
Adun
Eni Owo
Kiniun Alhaji
Àtànpàkò Otún
Sekere
Ayé Ajekú
Eko O'tobi 1
Eko O'tobi 2
Fila Daddy
Tomisin

See also
List of Yoruba people

References

External links

Year of birth missing (living people)
Living people
Yoruba actresses
Actresses from Oyo State
20th-century Nigerian actresses
21st-century Nigerian actresses
Actresses in Yoruba cinema